The Kansas Health Science Center–Kansas College of Osteopathic Medicine (also known as KHSC-KansasCOM or simply KansasCOM) is a private medical school in Wichita, Kansas that offers a Doctor of Osteopathic Medicine (D.O.) medical degree. The medical school is organized by the Kansas Health Science Center. In December 2021, the college was approved by the Commission on Osteopathic College Accreditation to begin recruiting students. The inaugural class will be accepted for the 2022–23 academic year.

References

External links
 Official website
 Official Kansas Health Science Center website

Education in Wichita, Kansas
Educational institutions established in 2022
Universities and colleges
Osteopathic medical schools in the United States
Private universities and colleges in Kansas
Universities and colleges in Kansas